Francesco Martelli (died 9 March 1578) was a Roman Catholic prelate who served as Bishop of Reggio Emilia (1575–1578).

Biography
On 15 April 1569, Francesco Martelli was appointed during the papacy of Pope Pius V as Bishop of Reggio Emilia. He served as Bishop of Reggio Emilia until his death on 9 March 1578.

References

External links and additional sources
 (for Chronology of Bishops) 
 (for Chronology of Bishops) 

16th-century Italian Roman Catholic bishops
Bishops appointed by Pope Pius V
1578 deaths